Georg Krauß, from 1905 Ritter von Krauß (25 December 1826 – 5 November 1906) was a German industrialist and the founder of the Krauss Locomotive Works (Locomotivfabrik Krauß & Comp.) in Munich, Germany and Linz, Upper Austria. The spelling of the company name was later changed from Krauß to Krauss, once the form of the name in capital letters on the company's emblems had become established.

Early Beginnings

Krauß was born in Augsburg as the eldest child of four, to master weaver, Johann Georg Friedrich Krauß and his wife Anna Margarethe, née Stahl. After attending primary school, he went to the Royal Polytechnic School, founded in 1833 (today Augsburg High School). After completing his education he worked temporarily in the Maffei Locomotive Works in Munich, then for the Royal Bavarian State Railways (Königlich Bayerische Staatsbahn) in Hof, Germany, Kempten and Lindau. A decisive step in his development was his job as a master machinist with the Northeast Railway (Nordostbahn) in Zurich, where he built his first four locomotives. From then on he was already preparing for the founding of his factory in Munich. In spite of strong opposition from the already established Joseph Anton von Maffei he obtained the necessary capital to found the factory on the Marsfeld in Munich-Neuhausen on 17 July 1866,  a satellite factory at Munich South station in 1872 and another works in 1880 in Linz (Austria) in order to avoid the high import taxes of the Danube monarchy.

A locomotive built by Krauss, the "Degen und Wiegand KARL" (serial number 2062) was constructed in 1888.  Degen und Wiegand were a construction company in Kiel.  The locomotive was sold to and used by various construction companies, including Hermann Bachstein.  It was also used for rail services on the Sued Harz Eisenbahn. The Centrale Limburgsche Spoorweg (CLS) obtained the locomotive through purchase in 1916.  It remained in service until 1921 and was scrapped in 1923.

Further Successes
Krauß was not just a successful locomotive manufacturer, but also supported other technological developments, like the first refrigerators by Linde. He took part in the expansion of railway lines in the Saxony, Thuringia and Alsace, in the conversion of the horse-drawn tramways to steam operations in Munich and Vienna, the building of the Chiemsee Railway and the establishment of the Lokalbahn AG. In addition in 1876 he was one of the founders of the present day Institute of German Engineers, the VDI, (Verein Deutscher Ingenieure) and in 1903 generously supported the creation of the Deutsches Museum with 100,000 marks and the repurchase of his first locomotive "Landwührden".

Twists of Fate
In 1876 his first wife Lydia died and so too did his only son, Conrad, after an accident in 1885, whereupon Krauß converted his firm into public limited company and drew back from active business leadership. He remained chairman of the board until his death, however.

Honours
As early as 1880 he was awarded the Knight's Cross 1st Class of the Grand Duchy of Saxony-Weimar, as well as the title of Royal Bavarian Industrialist (Königlich bayerischer Kommerzienrat) from King Ludwig II of Bavaria for his services. In 1903 followed the Order of Merit of Holy Michael 3rd Class, and with the conferral of the Knights Cross of the Royal Order of Merit of the Bavarian Crown he rose on 6 March 1905 to ranks of the nobility. The Technical University of Munich awarded him the title of Doctor of Engineering honoris causa and the VDI gave him the Grashof commemorative coin.

A Life with Foresight
In 1905 Krauß decided to move the location of the factory from the crowded town centre out to Allach, from where its successor organisation still operates today. Sadly he did not live to see either the completion of the Deutsches Museum or the move to Allach. On 5 November 1906 the manufacturer Georg von Krauß died shortly before his 80th birthday in Munich. His friend and one of his first co-workers, Carl von Linde, took over the chair of the board. His factory made 7,186 locomotives from 1866 until its merger with the bankrupt Maffei locomotive works in 1931.

See also
 List of railway pioneers

References

Sources 
 Siegfried Baum: Die Augsburger Localbahn, EK Reihe Regionale Verkehrsgeschichte Band 30; Freiburg: Eisenbahn Kurier 2000, 
 Dr. Ing. Georg R. v. Krauss +, in: Die Lokomotive (Wien), Jahrgang 1906, Seite 213
 Alois Auer (Hrsg.): Krauss-Maffei. Lebenslauf einer Münchner Fabrik und ihrer Belegschaft. 3K-Verlag, Kösching 1988.

External links 
 https://web.archive.org/web/20070930083707/http://www.verein-der-ingenieure.de/ueber_uns/geschichte.html
 http://www.werkbahn.de/eisenbahn/lokbau/museum/pres_krauss.htm
 http://www.dampflokomotiven.net/Html/Krauss.html 
 Karl Schmidt, Krauss-Maffei, in: Historisches Lexikon Bayerns http://www.historisches-lexikon-bayerns.de/artikel/artikel_44907> (20.02.2007)
 

German railway entrepreneurs
German railway mechanical engineers
1826 births
1906 deaths
Businesspeople from Augsburg
Businesspeople from Munich
Bavarian nobility
19th-century German engineers
19th-century German businesspeople
Engineers from Bavaria